Jana Pechanová (born March 3, 1981 in Rakovník, Czechoslovakia) is an Olympic distance swimmer from the Czech Republic. She swam for the Czech Olympic team at the 2004, 2008, 2012 and 2016.

At the 2004 Summer Olympics, she in 19th in the 10 km open water marathon.  At the 2008 Summer Olympics, Pechanová finished 8th in 10 km distance.  At the 2012 Summer Olympics, she finished 9th in the same event.

References

1981 births
Living people
Female long-distance swimmers
Czech female swimmers
Olympic swimmers of the Czech Republic
Swimmers at the 2004 Summer Olympics
Swimmers at the 2008 Summer Olympics
Swimmers at the 2012 Summer Olympics
Swimmers at the 2016 Summer Olympics
World Aquatics Championships medalists in open water swimming
Universiade medalists in swimming
Universiade silver medalists for the Czech Republic
Medalists at the 1999 Summer Universiade
Medalists at the 2001 Summer Universiade
Medalists at the 2005 Summer Universiade
People from Rakovník
Sportspeople from the Central Bohemian Region